The Moxley Covered Bridge is a historic covered bridge carrying Moxley Road across the First Branch White River in southern Chelsea, Vermont.  Built in 1886-87, it is the town's only surviving 19th-century covered bridge.  It was listed on the National Register of Historic Places in 1974.

Description and history
It is a single span multiple kingpost truss structure, resting on abutments of dry laid stone and concrete facing. The southern abutment is set on a prominent rock outcrop. The bridge is covered by a metal roof, and its exterior is finished in vertical board siding, which extends a short way to the interior of the portals. The trusses include wrought iron rods, and are set at an offset to one another, giving the bridge the shape of a parallelogram. A laminated beam has been bolted to the underside of the floor planking to provide additional strength.

The bridge was built c. 1886-87.  It is Chelsea's only 19th-century covered bridge, and is one of a concentrated group (most in neighboring Tunbridge) of such bridges in the state.

See also
National Register of Historic Places listings in Orange County, Vermont
List of covered bridges in Vermont
List of bridges on the National Register of Historic Places in Vermont

References

Covered bridges on the National Register of Historic Places in Vermont
National Register of Historic Places in Orange County, Vermont
Bridges completed in 1886
Covered bridges in Orange County, Vermont
Buildings and structures in Chelsea, Vermont
Road bridges on the National Register of Historic Places in Vermont
Wooden bridges in Vermont
King post truss bridges in the United States
1886 establishments in Vermont